The Angel is a Grade II listed public house at 697 Uxbridge Road, Hayes, Middlesex, UB4 8HX.

It was built in 1926, and designed by Nowell Parr for Fuller's Brewery.

It was Grade II listed in 2015 by Historic England.

See also
 List of pubs in London

References

Buildings by Nowell Parr
Pubs in the London Borough of Hillingdon
Grade II listed pubs in London
Grade II listed buildings in the London Borough of Hillingdon